Layeq Sherali (1941–2000, in Tajiki/Persian: Лоиқ Шералӣ/لائق شیرعلی, sometimes also Romanised as Laeq or Laiq or Loiq) was a Tajik poet, Iranologist and one of the most celebrated Persian literary figures of Tajikistan and central Asia.

Loiq Sher-Ali had expertise in classical Persian poetry. The influence of Firdowsi, Khayyam and Molana Jalaleddin-e Balkhi is evident in Shir-Ali's works. He also translated several literary master pieces into Persian.

He was the head of Tajik-Persian Language International Foundation in Middle Asia and he was called as Shah-Poet of Tajikistan. A chosen collection of his works is published in Iran, 1994. Another collection, "Rakh's Spirit" is published in Iran, 1999, by Mirzo Shakurzoda.

Poetry
An excerpt from one of Sher-Ali's most famous poems, about three years before his death:

یکی گفتی تو ایرانی، دیگر گفتی تو تاجیکی
Яке гуфтӣ ту эронӣ, дигар гуфтӣ ту тоҷикӣ
جدا از اصل خود میرد کسی مارا جدا کردست
Ҷудо аз асли худ мирад касе моро ҷудо кардаст

English:
Once you said "You're Iranian," then you said "You are Tajik"
May he die separated from his own origin, who has separated us

See also

 Persian literature
 Persian culture
 Greater Iran
 Mohammad Jan Shakouri

References

External links 
Shir-Ali, combining old and new styles in Persian poetry (BBC Persian)

Shir-Ali Layeq
Shir-Ali Layeq
2000 deaths
20th-century Tajikistani poets
Tajikistani male writers
Shir-Ali Layeq
Iranologists
People from Sughd Region
Members of the Congress of People's Deputies of the Soviet Union